UEFA European Under-21 Championship 2002 was the 13th staging of UEFA's European Under-21 Championship. The final tournament was hosted by Switzerland between 16 and 28 May 2002.

Czech Republic U-21s won the competition for the first time.

Qualification

The 47 national teams were divided into nine groups (one group of four + five groups of 5 + three groups of 6). The records of the nine group runners-up were then compared.  The top seven joined the nine winners in a play-off for the eight finals spots. One of the eight qualifiers was then chosen to host the remaining fixtures.

Squads

Matches

Group stage

Group A

Group B

Knockout stage

Semi-finals

Final

Goalscorers

3 goals
 Massimo Maccarone
2 goals
 Michal Pospíšil
 Pierre-Alain Frau
 Olivier Sorlin
 Alexander Frei
1 goal
 Koen Daerden
 Tom Soetaers
 Zdeněk Grygera
 Martin Jiránek
 David Rozehnal
 Gareth Barry
 Peter Crouch
 Jermain Defoe
 Alan Smith

1 goal, cont.
 Sylvain Armand
 Sidney Govou
 Péguy Luyindula
 Steed Malbranque
 Xenofon Gittas
 Giorgos Kyriazis
 Christos Patsatzoglou
 Emiliano Bonazzoli
 Andrea Pirlo
 Ariza Makukula
 Hélder Postiga
 Filipe Teixeira
 Hugo Viana
 Ricardo Cabanas
Own goals
 Koen Daerden (for France)

External links 
 Results Archive at UEFA.com
 RSSSF Results Archive at rsssf.com

 
UEFA European Under-21 Championship
International association football competitions hosted by Switzerland
UEFA European Under-21 Championship
UEFA
May 2002 sports events in Europe
2002 in youth association football